South Horizons West is one of the 17 constituencies in the Southern District, Hong Kong. The constituency returns one district councillor to the Southern District Council, with an election every four years.

South Horizons East constituency is loosely based on the western part of the South Horizons in Ap Lei Chau with estimated population of 15,088.

Councillors represented

Election results

2010s

2000s

1990s

Notes

Citations

References
2011 District Council Election Results (Southern)
2007 District Council Election Results (Southern)
2003 District Council Election Results (Southern)
1999 District Council Election Results (Southern)

Constituencies of Hong Kong
Constituencies of Southern District Council
1999 establishments in Hong Kong
Constituencies established in 1999
Ap Lei Chau